Agar is a village in Baragyz geňeşligi, Dänew District, Lebap Province in eastern Turkmenistan, near the border with Afghanistan. 

Nearby towns and villages include Gyzylaýak (0.8 nm), Oba (0.8 nm), Krasnyy Turkmenistan (2.5 nm), Burguçy geňeşligi (4.0 nm), Kausy (4.0 nm), Daýhan (4.0 nm), Jeňellihatap (2.8 nm), Çagagüzer (4.3 nm).

See also 
List of cities, towns and villages in Turkmenistan
OpenStreetMap / Districts in Turkmenistan

References

External links
Satellite map at Maplandia.com

Populated places in Lebap Region